Noemi Lung Zaharia (born May 16, 1968) is a retired butterfly, freestyle and medley swimmer from Romania, who won two individual medley medals at the 1988 Olympics. A year before she collected a record five gold medals at the 1987 Summer Universiade in Zagreb.

In 1990 she moved to the United States, where she received a scholarship in 1995 and graduated in management from the Florida International University in Miami. She was women's swimming Head Coach at the Florida University from 2002 to 2010. In 2020, she received a PhD in sports leadership from the United States Sports Academy. Since 2010 she is the Director of the Aquatic and Fitness Center at Miami Dade College North campus in Miami, FL, before becoming an assistant professor at the University of Alabama Huntsville. Since December 1995 she is married to the Olympic handball player Cristian Zaharia.

References 

1968 births
Living people
Romanian female butterfly swimmers
Romanian female freestyle swimmers
Romanian female medley swimmers
Sportspeople from Baia Mare
Romanian expatriate sportspeople in the United States
Olympic swimmers of Romania
Swimmers at the 1988 Summer Olympics
Swimmers at the 1992 Summer Olympics
Olympic bronze medalists for Romania
Olympic silver medalists for Romania
Place of birth missing (living people)
Olympic bronze medalists in swimming
Medalists at the 1988 Summer Olympics
World Aquatics Championships medalists in swimming
European Aquatics Championships medalists in swimming
Olympic silver medalists in swimming
Universiade medalists in swimming
Universiade gold medalists for Romania
Universiade bronze medalists for Romania
Medalists at the 1987 Summer Universiade
20th-century Romanian women